Thijmen Joel Sander Nijhuis (born 25 July 1998) is a Dutch football player who plays as a goalkeeper for Eredivisie club Utrecht and their reserves squad Jong Utrecht.

Club career
He made his professional debut in the Eerste Divisie for Jong FC Utrecht on 5 August 2016 in a game against NAC Breda.

On 15 July 2021, he extended his contract with Utrecht until 2023 and was loaned to MVV for the 2021–22 season. The loan was terminated early on 14 January 2022, and Nijhuis was assigned to Jong FC Utrecht.

References

External links
 

1998 births
Living people
People from Wierden
Footballers from Overijssel
Association football goalkeepers
Dutch footballers
FC Utrecht players
Jong FC Utrecht players
MVV Maastricht players
Eerste Divisie players
Eredivisie players